Deuterocohnia is a genus of plants in the family Bromeliaceae, subfamily Pitcairnioideae, endemic to South America. The genus is named for Ferdinand Julius Cohn, Jewish botanist and bacteriologist.

Plants once described as belonging to the genus Abromeitiella have been reevaluated and reclassified within Deuterocohnia following modern DNA analysis.

Species
 Deuterocohnia bracteosa W. Till & L. Hromadnik - Bolivia
 Deuterocohnia brevifolia (Grisebach) M.A. Spencer & L.B. Smith - Bolivia, Argentina
 Deuterocohnia brevispicata Rauh & L. Hromadnik - Bolivia
 Deuterocohnia chrysantha (Philippi) Mez - Chile
 Deuterocohnia digitata L.B. Smith - Bolivia, Argentina
 Deuterocohnia gableana Vásquez & Ibisch - Bolivia
 Deuterocohnia glandulosa E. Gross - Bolivia
 Deuterocohnia haumanii Castellanos - Argentina 
 Deuterocohnia longipetala (Baker) Mez - Bolivia, Argentina, Peru
 Deuterocohnia lorentziana (Mez) M.A. Spencer & L.B. Smith - Argentina 
 Deuterocohnia lotteae (Rauh) M.A. Spencer & L.B. Smith - Bolivia
 Deuterocohnia meziana Kuntze ex Mez
 var. carmineoviridiflora Rauh - Bolivia
 var. meziana -  - Bolivia, Paraguay, Mato Grosso do Sul
 Deuterocohnia pedicellata W. Till - Chuquisaca
 Deuterocohnia recurvipetala E. Gross - Argentina 
 Deuterocohnia scapigera (Rauh & L. Hromadnik) M.A. Spencer & L.B. Smith
 subsp. sanctae-crucis Vásquez & Ibisch - Bolivia
 subsp. scapigera - Bolivia
 Deuterocohnia schreiteri Castellanos - Argentina 
 Deuterocohnia seramisiana R. Vásquez, Ibisch & E. Gross - Bolivia
 Deuterocohnia strobilifera Mez
 var. inermis L.B. Smith - Bolivia
 var. strobilifera - Bolivia

References

External links
FCBS Deuterocohnia Photos
BSI Genera Gallery photos

 
Bromeliaceae genera
Flora of South America